Grahame House, Graham House, Mansion House, Graeme House, or Patuxent Manor, is a historic home located at Lower Marlboro, Calvert County, Maryland. It is an 18th-century original -story brick shell laid in Flemish bond with a steeply pitched gable roof. Later alterations have included the purchase and removal of the fine paneling throughout the house to the Winterthur Museum, Garden, and Library. 

Charles Grahame, for whom the home is named, was associated with Frederick Calvert, sixth Lord Baltimore, through Grahame's brother, David Grahame (who married Calvert's cousin, Charlotte Hyde) and with Thomas Johnson, first elected Governor of the State of Maryland, through Grahame's son (who married Johnson's daughter).

It was listed on the National Register of Historic Places in 1972.

References

External links
, including undated photo, at Maryland Historical Trust

Houses on the National Register of Historic Places in Maryland
Houses in Calvert County, Maryland
Houses completed in 1754
Historic American Buildings Survey in Maryland
1754 establishments in Maryland
National Register of Historic Places in Calvert County, Maryland